Jean Hamilius (born 5 February 1927) is a former Luxembourgish politician and government minister from the Democratic Party. He was born in Luxembourg City. He served as  Minister for Agriculture and Minister for Public Works (1974–79) as well as Associate Minister for Foreign Affairs (1976–1979) in Gaston Thorn's government (1974–79). He sat in the Chamber of Deputies between 1969 and 1984 (excepting the five years he spent as a minister), and in the communal council of Luxembourg City (1969–74). He was one of Luxembourg's six Members of the European Parliament from 1979 until 1981.

Hamilius ran at the 1952 Summer Olympics, in Helsinki, in the 400 metres and 4 × 400 metres relay, in an athletics deputation best known for the inclusion of Luxembourg's only gold medalist, Josy Barthel. He is the son of Émile Hamilius (1897–1971), himself a former DP politician and Mayor of Luxembourg City (1946–1963), as well as having competed at the Summer Olympics (in 1920), like his son.

Footnotes

1927 births
Living people
Ministers for Public Works of Luxembourg
Members of the Chamber of Deputies (Luxembourg)
Councillors in Luxembourg City
Democratic Party (Luxembourg) politicians
Luxembourgian male sprinters
Olympic athletes of Luxembourg
Athletes (track and field) at the 1952 Summer Olympics
Luxembourgian sportsperson-politicians
Free University of Brussels (1834–1969) alumni
People from Luxembourg City
Democratic Party (Luxembourg) MEPs
MEPs for Luxembourg 1979–1984
Knights of the Order of Merit of the Grand Duchy of Luxembourg
Alumni of the Athénée de Luxembourg
Ministers for Agriculture of Luxembourg